Stenstaden, the Stone City, is the name of the historical centre of Sundsvall in Sweden. It consists of stone buildings, several of those in Art Nouveau style, which were built after the 1888 Sundsvall Fire. Stenstaden is structured in an orthogonal grid system of rectangular city blocks in the east-south-eastern part of Sundsvall.

References 

Medelpad
Geography of Västernorrland County